The Union War Book of India is a document outlining the response and functions of the government during war. States also have their State War Books.

References 

National security of India